OVHS may refer to:

Ocean View High School
Ocean View Hills School
Orchard View High School
Owen Valley Community High School
Oley Valley High School